Greatstone is a beach-side town, the third town up from the "point" of the Romney Marsh area of Kent.
It is situated near the largest town there, New Romney in Kent, England. Although permission was given for a company to construct large numbers of homes and facilities in the 1920s, only a small number were actually built. There was widespread development in the 1960s and 1970s, however, leading to a sizable community. The church of St Peter's, built in the 1960s, is a daughter church of All Saints, Lydd, in which parish half of Greatstone is situated. It is in the civil parish of Lydd.
There is a small group of shops at one end of the town, and the other end simply melds into Lydd-on-Sea.
The local school is the Greatstone Primary School, from which most students either go on to The Marsh Academy, the Folkestone School for Girls or the Harvey Grammar School.

Sound Mirrors
Facing Greatstone Lakes from RAF Denge, on the north east edge of Dungeness Nature Reserve, are a bizarre series of concrete dishes built as Sound Mirrors. They used curved surfaces to focus the faint sound waves of incoming enemy aircraft onto single point where an expert listener with a stethoscope would be trained to decipher the planes' direction and speed of approach by comparison with similar listenings at nearby sound mirrors of which there were three different design-sizes. The mirrors became obsolete with the coming of radar and were abandoned.

Transport
Greatstone has two main roads from two locations. One way to Lydd, Lydd Airport and East Sussex or another to New Romney and the rest of Kent. The Romney, Hythe and Dymchurch Railway runs through the village from New Romney to Lydd-on-Sea and Dungeness or to Dymchurch and Hythe. There is a station in the Romney Sands Holiday Park: Romney Sands. 
Stagecoach in East Kent runs local buses to other towns. From 1937 until 1967 the town was connected to the national railway system, on the New Romney branch operated by the Southern Railway and subsequently British Railways, with its own station Greatstone-on-Sea Halt.

In the media 
The beach features on Teletubbies on BBC, Series 1: 11. Windy Day, Dec 14, 2015.

See also
 Greatstone Dunes railway station
 Greatstone-on-Sea Halt railway station
 Littlestone-on-Sea

References

External links

Villages in Kent
Populated coastal places in Kent
Seaside resorts in England
Beaches of Kent